The Charlotte 49ers men's soccer team is an intercollegiate varsity sports team of the University of North Carolina at Charlotte. As of the upcoming 2022 season, the team is a member of the NCAA Division I American Athletic Conference (The American). The team plays their home games at Transamerica Field in Charlotte, North Carolina. In 2011, the team reached the championship of the NCAA Division I Men's Soccer Championship, for the first time in program history.

History

In 1996, the Charlotte 49ers men's soccer team became the first Conference USA team in any sport to reach the National semi-finals. The Niners won a school record 19 games. They went 7–1 in Conference USA to capture the regular season title. The Niners defeated College of Charleston, Notre Dame and Hartford to reach the national semi-finals before falling to Florida International in front of 20,269 fans in Richmond, Virginia. Goalkeeper Jon Busch becomes the Niners' second first team All-American after recording 12 shutouts and a 0.89 goals against average. Busch also earned Conference USA Defensive Player of the Year honors. John Tart was named Conference USA Coach of the Year.

The most notable season in Charlotte soccer history came in 2011 when the 49ers became the first team of any sport in school history to reach an NCAA national championship. The team was ranked in the top 25 throughout the entire season thanks to a challenging yet successful non-conference campaign. The Niners finished the regular season with an Atlantic 10 record of 6–1–2 and 13–3–2 record overall. After an early disappointing loss to Xavier in the Atlantic 10 tournament, Charlotte then went on a deep run in the NCAA Tournament. The unseeded Niners defeated Furman, No. 11 UAB, No. 10 Akron, and No. 5 Connecticut to advance to the program's second ever College Cup in Hoover, Alabama. The Niners went on to defeat No. 3 Creighton before falling to No. 1 North Carolina in the national championship game with a score of 1–0.

Charlotte's most recent conference change was announced during the 2021–22 offseason, when it left Conference USA (C-USA) for The American. The decision of the Sun Belt Conference to reinstate its men's soccer league effective with the 2022 season dropped the C-USA men's soccer membership to four. Of these four schools, three, including Charlotte, were scheduled to move fully to The American in the near future, with a 2023 entry date later confirmed. Accordingly, The American brought all four remaining C-USA men's soccer teams into its own soccer league.

Roster

As of August 10, 2021

Individual career records

Career goals

Career assists

Coaches

Head coach history

Professional players

Major League Soccer
Brandt Bronico (Charlotte FC)
Jon Busch (San Jose Earthquakes)
Mira Mupier (Chicago Fire)
Donnie Smith (New England Revolution)
Callum Montgomery (FC Dallas)
Elliot Panicco (Nashville SC)

USL Pro
Andres Cuero (Wilmington Hammerheads)
 Carson Price (San Antonio FC)
Charles Rodriguez (Wilmington Hammerheads)
Evan Harding (Richmond Kickers)
Adam Ruud (Charlotte Eagles)
Chris Salvaggione (Charlotte Eagles)
Mike Franks (Wilmington Hammerheads)
Grady Farmer (Wilmington Hammerheads)
David Hughes (Myrtle Beach Seadawgs)

North American Soccer League
Floyd Franks (Carolina RailHawks FC)
Giuseppe Gentile (San Antonio Scorpions)
Tyler Gibson (San Antonio Scorpions)

S.League
Graham Tatters (Woodlands Wellington FC)

References

External links
 

 
Soccer clubs in North Carolina
1976 establishments in North Carolina
Association football clubs established in 1976